Chaudhry Nazeer Ahmad (born 1 January 1958) is a Pakistani politician who had been a member of the National Assembly of Pakistan between 2002 and May 2018.

Early life
He was born on 1 January 1958 in Burewala

Political career

He was elected to the National Assembly of Pakistan as a candidate of Pakistan Muslim League (Q) (PML-Q) from Constituency NA-167 (Vehari-I) in 2002 Pakistani general election. Pakistan Peoples Party (PPP). In the same election, he also ran for the seat of the Provincial Assembly of the Punjab as a candidate of PML-Q from Constituency PP-233 (Vehari-II) but was unsuccessful. He received 18,163 vote and defeated Nazir Ahmad Mithu Dogar, a candidate of Pakistan Muslim League (N) (PML-N).

He was re-elected to the National Assembly as a candidate of PML-Q from Constituency NA-167 (Vehari-I) in 2008 Pakistani general election. He received 65,250 votes and defeated an independent candidate, Syed Sajid Mehdi. In the same election, he also ran for the seat of the National Assembly as an independent candidate from Constituency NA-168 (Vehari-II) but was unsuccessful. He received 282 votes and lost the seat to Azeem Daultana. In the same election, he also ran for the seat of the Provincial Assembly of the Punjab as a candidate of PML-Q from Constituency PP-233 (Vehari-II) but was unsuccessful. He received 19,912 votes and lost the seat to Sardar Khalid Saleem Bhatti, a candidate of PPP.

In 2010, he was disqualified to hold the National Assembly seat by the Supreme Court of Pakistan after he was found possessing fake degree.

He was re-elected to the National Assembly as a candidate of PML-N from Constituency NA-167 (Vehari-I) in 2013 Pakistani general election. He received 99,907 votes and defeated an independent candidate, Mohtarma Ayesha Nazeer Jat.

In October 2017, he was appointed as Federal Parliamentary Secretary for Law and justice.

References

Living people
1958 births
Pakistan Muslim League (Q) MNAs
Pakistan Muslim League (N) MNAs
Pakistani MNAs 2002–2007
Pakistani MNAs 2008–2013
Pakistani MNAs 2013–2018